The roupie or rupee was the currency of French India. It was equal to the Indian rupee issued by the British and then Indian governments. One rupee was worth 2.40 francs-or. Until 1871 it was issued as coins with the roupie divided into 8 fanons, each of 3 doudous or 20 cash. From 1891, banknotes were issued by the Banque de l'Indochine, which circulated alongside coins issued by British India.

Table of 1843 exchange rates

See also

 Puducherry
 French India
 Madras fanam

References

Annuaire statistique des établissements français dans l'Inde By Pierre-Constant Sicé, 1843.

External links
French Indian rupee at the currency museum of the Reserve Bank of India 

Modern obsolete currencies
Former French colonies
French India
Historical currencies of India